The 2009 World Military Track and Field Championship was the 43rd edition of the international athletics competition between military sports personnel. The competition was held from 6 to 13 June at the Vasil Levski National Stadium in Sofia, Bulgaria. A total of 398 athletes (318 men and 80 women) from 33 nations competed in the 29-event programme.

Medal summary

Men

Women

Medal table

References

Results
Almeida, Renato (2009). CISM Yearbook 2009 . CISM. Retrieved on 2013-10-13.

External links
Official website

World Military Track and Field Championships
World Military
2009 in Bulgarian sport
Sports competitions in Sofia
International athletics competitions hosted by Bulgaria